This is a list of known stone casts used throughout the animated television series, Di-Gata Defenders. Sorcery in RaDos mostly uses special dice-like stones called Di-Gata Stones as a casting medium, and draw upon the land (or water if the caster uses Aqua Stones) and a portion of the person's inner power. The innate powers found within the Wizards of Yan do not abide to using physical Di-Gata stones, as they can create them via summoning. However, they use their own power to do so. 

When the stones are summoned, they can form henges to manifest themselves as attacks. To create Henges, Warrior Stones and Booster Stones are needed, and the Booster Stones must be the all identical, or a mis-cast will occur (unintended spell effect). But there is no such thing as a powerful spell, as each spell the caster knows appears to be used based on the situation the battle or task has gotten to, even if the caster was to put in a Warrior and 3 Boosters.

The exception to the rules are Guardians. They live inside their own stones or items and require no power cost from the land nor the caster, with an exception to Booster Stones to increase their effectiveness. However, they have a certain amount of longevity before reverting to their stone form. Guardians themselves use their own bodies to attack.

If a stone caster has no energy, then the stones cannot work. Warriors and Boosters cannot work on large bodies of water, as there is no land to draw from. Stones will also not work if some source messes with the land's general energies (certain locations, a Negastorm are examples).

Offensive casts using warrior + booster stones

Shared Attacks 
These sections have the attacks which more than one caster can use, no matter the sigils they possess.

Warp Whip  This attack was first introduced in Dark Equinox:  Part One when the Zads first captured Kara, but the name wasn't discovered until Malco Redux when Dark Malco stormed the monastery of Yan-Suma, looking for the Orb of Ogama-Yan.  Only members of the Ethos use this attack.  It is a long strip of material with a darkened end which the holder uses as a weapon via lashing.

Withdraw This is not an attack per se, but on the rare occasion a caster might call back their guardian to their holding place with this command.

Merge Form  This is the attack that is called out when the caster wants to merge with his/her guardian.

Defensive Casts using Shield Stones
Shield stones are very good in combat against the Orders of Infinis. At some points in combating with the Ethos the shields are no use to the strong sigil energy of the Ethos' powers. Wizards of Yan do not always have to use shield stones. Sometimes he or she will be able to say a spell such as "Sum, Yan, Altas" then their shields are more stronger and enhanced because of their powers. Regular Rados people cannot summon stones from their bare hands. Wizards of Yan were all together and the people of the Order of Infinis were with them. Including Nazmul, in the episode Back Track they also had the army with them too when Melosa's Grandmother was still alive as a Wizard of Yan. These shield stones do a lot more and if someone has shield breakers (i.e.: Malco), the shield stones would be useless against those sigil power stones.

Vanguard Aegis Summons a shield that can withstand attacks. Requires any amount of shield stones, but attacks get weaker depending on cost. Can also stack or multiple users can form in a way to offer protection on all fronts (e.g. Ogama Defense formation in "The Road Less Travelled")
                          
Fortified Front Summons a shield dome or group of shields that surround the caster, covers attacks from all angles, but not as effective in some cases.

Barricade Array Summons mini-shields of the sigil used. These shields can block small attacks, pick up smaller objects, deflect some spells or attack an enemy (Snare used this function against Adam). These shields are controlled by the caster.

Protector Much like Vanguard Aegis, but more fortified and joins with other Defenders.

Suffocating Sphere The only shield that attacks. It uses Barricade Array functionality, except can enclose an enemy and possibly disintegrate it, more potent against energy forms. Requires at least 2 Defenders to use.

Fortified Fortress Much like Fortified Front. It was used in the Episode Vitus and Melosa used it to defend Seth and herself against an old guardian guarding something near. It has two stones which will be able to last for some time, depending on how many shield stones you use.

Incantation
Magic items